William (German: Wilhelm)  called William the Younger (c. 1425 – 7 July 1503) was duke of Brunswick-Lüneburg and ruled over the Wolfenbüttel and Göttingen principalities.

The eldest son of William the Victorious, Duke of Brunswick-Lüneburg,  he was given the Principality of Göttingen by his father in 1473. In 1482 the father died, and he and his brother Frederick succeeded their father in the remaining parts of his state; however, William had Frederick imprisoned in 1484 and made himself sole ruler. In 1490 he bought the City of Helmstedt from the Abbot of Werden. In 1491, William gave the Principality of Wolfenbüttel including Calenberg to his sons, and kept only Göttingen to himself. In 1495 he resigned as prince of Göttingen in favour of his son Eric I in return for an appanage. William died on 7 July 1503 in Hardegsen.

Family
William married Elizabeth ( – 7 September 1520), daughter of Bodo VII, Count of Stolberg-Wernigerode. They had three children:
 Anne (1460 – 16 May 1520) married William I, Landgrave of Lower Hesse
 Henry (24 June 1463 – 23 June 1514)
 Eric (16 February 1470 – 26 July 1540) married 1: Katharina (1468–1524) Duchess of Saxony; 2: Elisabeth (1510–1558) Duchess of Brandenburg

Ancestors

References
Zedlers Universal-Lexicon, vol. 56, p. 585–586

|-

|-

|-

1425 births
1503 deaths
Princes of Calenberg
Princes of Göttingen
Princes of Wolfenbüttel
Middle House of Brunswick